Saidya serpent pillar, is one of the earliest Ahom inscription founded till date. The pillar dates to the reign of  Suhungmung Dihingia Raja (1497–1539). The epigraph consisting 9 and a half lines on the pillar is a proclamation issued by Suhungmung asking the Mishimis to pay annual tribute in certain articles and to dwell on one side of the Dibang River.

It was re-discovered in 1921 in Sadiya, the pillar is now preserved in Assam State Museum since  1953.

Notes

References 

Monumental columns in India
Indian inscriptions
India
 
Sculptures in India
Indian architectural history
Outdoor sculptures in India
Archaeological artifacts of India
History of Assam
Assam
 
Assamese inscriptions